Herbert G. Barber (August 14, 1870 – October 5, 1947) was an American politician and lawyer. A Republican, he served in both chambers of the Vermont General Assembly and as Vermont Attorney General.

Biography
Herbert Goodell Barber was born in Wardsboro, Vermont on August 14, 1870.  He was educated in Wardsboro and Brattleboro, studied law at the Brattleboro firm of Eleazer L. Waterman and James Loren Martin, and was admitted to the bar in 1893.  He practiced in Brattleboro, and established a firm with his brother Frank, H. G. and F. E. Barber.  Both Barbers were active in politics as Republicans, and served in local offices including Justice of the Peace, and party positions including member of the Republican State Committee.  In addition, Frank Barber served as state's attorney for Windham County from 1910 to 1912, and as judge of Brattleboro's municipal court.

Herbert Barber served as state's attorney from 1898 to 1900, a member of the Vermont House of Representatives from 1908 to 1910, and a member of the Vermont State Senate from 1912 to 1914.

In 1914, Barber ran successfully for Vermont Attorney General.  Vermont's law changing the start of terms of office from December to January took effect in 1914, so Governor Allen M. Fletcher appointed Barber to serve for the month of December 1914, bridging the gap between the end of Rufus E. Brown's term in November 1914 and the start of Barber's in January 1915.  Barber was reelected in 1916, and served from December 1914 to January 1919.  He did not run for reelection in 1918.  In 1935, Barber served another term in the Vermont House of Representatives.

Barber died in Brattleboro on October 5, 1947.  He was buried at Meeting House Hill Cemetery in Brattleboro.

Family
In 1909, Barber married Florence Whittier of Montpelier.  They were the parents of three children: Wendell, Elizabeth, and Clarence.

References

Sources

Books

Internet

Newspapers

External links

1870 births
1947 deaths
People from Brattleboro, Vermont
Vermont lawyers
State's attorneys in Vermont
Republican Party Vermont state senators
Republican Party members of the Vermont House of Representatives
Vermont Attorneys General
Burials in Vermont